Vzmorye is an settlement under the administrative jurisdiction of the town of Svetly in Kaliningrad Oblast, Russia.

Location 
The village is located in the historic region of Prussia, in the southwest of the Sambia Peninsula on the Vistula Lagoon, halfway between Kaliningrad and Primorsk. Regional road 27A-016 (ex A193) runs through what was once the largest village on the lagoon. The nearest train station is Lyublino on the Kaliningrad–Baltiysk railway line.

Population:

References 

Rural localities in Kaliningrad Oblast